Brucella grignonensis is a bacterium. Its type strain is OgA9aT (= LMG 18954T =DSM 13338T).

References

Further reading

Bathe, Stephan, et al. "Genetic and phenotypic microdiversity of Ochrobactrum spp." FEMS microbiology ecology 56.2 (2006): 272–280. *

External links 

LPSN
Type strain of Ochrobactrum grignonense at BacDive -  the Bacterial Diversity Metadatabase

Hyphomicrobiales
Bacteria described in 2000